Hermógenes Netto (born 14 August 1913, date of death unknown) was a Brazilian cyclist. He competed in the individual road race event at the 1936 Summer Olympics.

References

External links
 

1913 births
Year of death missing
Brazilian male cyclists
Brazilian road racing cyclists
Olympic cyclists of Brazil
Cyclists at the 1936 Summer Olympics